Liolaemus incaicus is a species of lizard in the family  Liolaemidae. It is native to Peru.

References

incaicus
Reptiles described in 2007
Taxa named by Fernando Lobo
Taxa named by Andrés Sebastián Quinteros
Reptiles of Peru